Scott Reid is a Canadian politician. He was elected to represent the district of St. George's-Stephenville East in the Newfoundland and Labrador House of Assembly in a 2014 by-election; in the 2015 election, he was re-elected in the new district of St. George's-Humber. He is a member of the Liberal Party.

Reid was raised in the community of Jeffrey's. Reid has taught at the Department of Political Science and the Faculty of Business at Memorial University. Reid previously worked as a researcher under the leadership of Roger Grimes, Gerry Reid, Yvonne Jones, and Dwight Ball. From 2008 to 2010, he was a senior policy advisor to Liberal MP Siobhan Coady.

Reid was re-elected in the 2019 provincial election. On September 6, 2019, he was appointed acting Speaker of the House of Assembly following Perry Trimper re-entering cabinet. Reid was elected Speaker at the beginning of the fall 2019 session of the House of Assembly defeating Trimper. He was re-elected in the 2021 provincial election. He ran for re-election as Speaker at the beginning of the 50th General Assembly but was defeated by Derek Bennett.

Election results

|-

|-

|-

|}

}
|-

|-

|align="right"|948
|align="right"|25.36
|align="right"|-23.95
|-

|NDP
|Bernice Hancock
|align="right"|579
|align="right"|15.49
|align="right"|-1.03

|}

References

Liberal Party of Newfoundland and Labrador MHAs
Memorial University of Newfoundland alumni
Academic staff of the Memorial University of Newfoundland
University of Ottawa alumni
Year of birth missing (living people)
Living people
21st-century Canadian politicians